The Workingman's Savings Bank & Trust Co. Building, located at 800 East Ohio Street in the East Allegheny neighborhood of Pittsburgh, Pennsylvania, was built in 1901.  It was added to the List of City of Pittsburgh historic designations on March 10, 2009. Formerly a Mellon Bank until 1971, the building was sold to the Catholic Diocese of Pittsburgh with plans to convert it to a church. However, the expense of the project proved too costly and it was instead donated to the ARC House rehabilitation center network. The building remained their headquarters from 1976 to 2006. It is currently vacant.

References

Buildings and structures in Pittsburgh
Commercial buildings completed in 1901